Lucian Pârvu (born 14 June 1982 in Craiova) is a Romanian former footballer.

External links
 
 

1982 births
Living people
Romanian footballers
Liga I players
Liga II players
FC U Craiova 1948 players
ACF Gloria Bistrița players
FCV Farul Constanța players
CS Pandurii Târgu Jiu players
CSM Jiul Petroșani players
SCM Râmnicu Vâlcea players
CS Otopeni players
AFC Chindia Târgoviște players
FC Gloria Buzău players
Super League Greece players
Ergotelis F.C. players
Cypriot Second Division players
Doxa Katokopias FC players
Romanian expatriate footballers
Romanian expatriate sportspeople in Greece
Expatriate footballers in Greece
Romanian expatriate sportspeople in Cyprus
Expatriate footballers in Cyprus
Association football wingers
Sportspeople from Craiova